"Don't Talk to Strangers" is the second single from Hedley's third studio album, The Show Must Go released on October 27, 2009. The song has peaked at #11 on the Canadian Hot 100.

Music video
The music video was released in November 2009. The plot has Hedley being kept hostage by a psychotic but attractive middle-aged woman. She uses the band for entertainment and sexual pleasure, killing them and throwing them into the back of her trunk in the end. The moral of the story is, of course, "don't talk to strangers."

Charts

Year-end charts

References

2009 singles
2009 songs
Hedley (band) songs
Universal Music Canada singles
Songs written by Brian Howes
Songs written by Jacob Hoggard